Taxi at Midnight (German: Die Mitternachtstaxe) is a 1929 German silent thriller film directed by Harry Piel and starring Piel, Betty Bird and Philipp Manning. It was shot at the Staaken and Grunewald Studios in Berlin. The film's art direction was by Fritz Maurischat and Max Knaake.

Cast
 Harry Piel as Harry Pattler 
 Betty Bird as Lilly 
 Philipp Manning as Prof. Dr. Olten 
 Albert Paulig as Direktor Cremer 
 Hans Sanden as Knackermaxe 
 Hermann Böttcher as Kommissar Tenner 
 Bruno Ziener as W.S. Pinkus 
 Aruth Wartan as Martini 
 Maria Asti as Mimi 
 Steffie Vida as Bardame 
 Jaria Kirsanoff as Bardame 
 El' Dura as Bardame 
 Eva Schmid-Kayser as Bardame 
 Hedy Meyer-Seebohn as Bardame 
 Wolfgang von Schwindt as Mann im Smoking 
 Georg Schmieter as Mann im Smoking 
 Charles Francois as Mann im Smoking 
 Henry Bender as Erster Wachtmeister 
 Julius Falkenstein as Zweiter Wachtmeister 
 Georg John as Dritter Wachtmeister 
 Charly Berger as Motorradfahrer

References

Bibliography
 Prawer, S.S. Between Two Worlds: The Jewish Presence in German and Austrian Film, 1910-1933. Berghahn Books, 2005.

External links

1929 films
Films of the Weimar Republic
German silent feature films
German thriller films
1920s thriller films
Films directed by Harry Piel
German black-and-white films
Silent thriller films
Films shot at Staaken Studios
1920s German films